The Latvian Rugby Federation is the governing body for rugby in Latvia. It oversees the various national teams and the development of the sport.  

The federation was founded in 1991, although its origins go back to 1960, when Latvia was under Soviet occupation. The federation was admitted to FIRA in 1992.

Leadership

See also
 Rugby union in Latvia
 Latvia national rugby union team
Latvia national rugby sevens team

External links
Latvian Rugby Federation
Latvia at World Rugby

Rugby union in Latvia
Rugby
Rugby union governing bodies in Europe